Potamopyrgus oscitans is a species of minute freshwater snail with an operculum, an aquatic gastropod mollusc or micromollusc in the family Hydrobiidae. This species is endemic to Australia.

References

Gastropods of Australia
Hydrobiidae
Gastropods described in 1944
Taxonomy articles created by Polbot